Elai was a bodyguard for King Zhou of the Chinese Shang dynasty. He was an ancestor of Feizi, the founder of the state of Qin. His brother Jisheng (季勝) was an ancestor of Zaofu, the founder of the state of Zhao. According to the Records of the Grand Historian (Shiji) by Sima Qian, Elai was known for his immense physical strength.

In the historical novel Romance of the Three Kingdoms by Luo Guanzhong, Cao Cao, impressed with Dian Wei's strength, states "This is old Elai again." Thus this fictional nickname of Dian Wei stuck with him, and he was henceforth known as "Elai" Dian Wei.

References 
 Sima Qian. Records of the Grand Historian.
 Luo Guanzhong. Romance of the Three Kingdoms, Chapter 10.

11th-century BC Chinese people
Shang dynasty people